The MacGregor 19, also called the PowerSailer 19, is an American trailerable sailboat that was designed by Roger MacGregor as a cruiser and first built in 1992.

Production
The design was built by the MacGregor Yacht Corporation in the United States from 1992 until 1995, but it is now out of production.

Design
The MacGregor 19 is a recreational motorsailer, built predominantly of fiberglass. Early production boats had a fractional sloop rig, while later ones had a masthead sloop rig. The hull has a raked stem, a slightly angled transom, dual transom-hung rudders controlled by a tiller and a retractable centerboard. It displaces  and carries  of flooding water ballast. The ballast is drained for road transport.

The boat is normally fitted with an  outboard motor for cruising, docking and maneuvering.

The design has sleeping accommodation for four people, with a double "V"-berth in the bow cabin and an aft cabin with a double berth under the cockpit. The galley is located above the bow cabin and is equipped with a two-burner stove and an icebox. The enclosed head is located amidships on the starboard side.

Operational history
In a 2010 review Steve Henkel wrote, "not too many sailboats can go 20 knots under power ... In the case of ... the PowerSailer ... the necessary sacrifices of sailing qualities (sailing speed, stability, manueverability, aesthetics) to attain speed under power will be unacceptable to many, if not most, sailors. Best features: Speed under power, of course, is the main selling feature. In addition, very shallow draft is good for exploring beaches. Her self-bailing cockpit is deep and comfortable. A sizable double berth extending all the way across the boat under the cockpit is about as roomy as you'll get on a 19-foot sailboat—but it's not for folks with claustrophobia, Worst features: Steering the PowerSailer 19 under sail can be very frustrating, especially when attempting to make sharp turns. This is partly because the twin rudders are too small for the job. Excessive side-slip when steering under power can also be a problem unless the centerboard is dropped. Water ballast provides inadequate stability in breezy wind conditions."

See also
List of sailing boat types

References

Motorsailers
1990s sailboat type designs
Sailing yachts
Trailer sailers
Sailboat type designs by Roger MacGregor
Sailboat types built by the MacGregor Yacht Corporation